Miljan Govedarica (born 26 May 1994) is a Bosnian professional footballer who plays as a left midfielder for Kryvbas Kryvyi Rih.

Club career
Born in Sarajevo, Govedarica started playing with local club  Slavija before signing with Serbian side Donji Srem and playing with them in the 2013–14 Serbian SuperLiga. After one season in Serbia, he returned to Slavija in the summer of 2014. 

In 2015, he left Slavija for Sloboda Tuzla. After Sloboda, Govedarica also played for Olimpik, Slavija again and Zvijezda 09, who he joined in January 2018. Govedarica won the First League of RS in the 2017–18 season and got promoted to the Bosnian Premier League with Zvijezda 09. He left the club after his contract expired on 29 May 2019.

On 11 June 2019, Govedarica signed a two year contract with Zrinjski Mostar. He made his official debut and scored his first goal for Zrinjski on 11 July 2019, in a 0–3 away win against Akademija Pandev in the 2019–20 UEFA Europa League first qualifying round. Govedarica made his first league appearance for Zrinjski on 21 July 2019, in a 1–0 away loss against Sarajevo. He scored his first league goal for Zrinjski on 24 August 2019, in a 4–0 home win against Borac Banja Luka. Govedarica left Zrinjski in June 2021.

International career
Govedarica's impressive start in the 2014–15 Bosnian Premier League season made him receive a call from Bosnia and Herzegovina U21 national team head coach Vlado Jagodić to play for the team, making his debut on 8 September 2014. Between 2014 and 2016, he made 2 appearances for the national team.

Honours
Sloboda Tuzla
Bosnian Premier League runner up: 2015–16
Bosnian Cup runner up: 2015–16

Zvijezda 09
First League of RS: 2017–18

References

External links
Miljan Govedarica at Sofascore
Miljan Govedarica Stats at utakmica.rs

1994 births
Living people
Footballers from Sarajevo
Serbs of Bosnia and Herzegovina
Association football midfielders
Bosnia and Herzegovina footballers
Bosnia and Herzegovina under-21 international footballers
FK Donji Srem players
FK Slavija Sarajevo players
FK Sloboda Tuzla players
FK Olimpik players
FK Zvijezda 09 players
HŠK Zrinjski Mostar players
Serbian SuperLiga players
Premier League of Bosnia and Herzegovina players
First League of the Republika Srpska players
Bosnia and Herzegovina expatriate footballers
Expatriate footballers in Serbia
Bosnia and Herzegovina expatriate sportspeople in Serbia